Øyvind Gustavsen (born 1937) is a Norwegian civil servant.

He took his sivilingeniør education at the Norwegian Institute of Technology. He was appointed director of the Norwegian Coastal Administration in 1995. Formerly he had held many administrative positions, including deputy under-secretary of state in the Ministry of the Environment, sub-director in the Norwegian Coastal Administration, chief administrative officer of Aust-Agder county and CEO of Aust-Agder Trafikkselskap.

In 2000 he resigned, one year before his term ended. Instead, he took a position as an advisor. Leif Jansen was acting director until the appointment of Øyvind Stene.

References

1937 births
Living people
Norwegian civil servants
Directors of government agencies of Norway
Norwegian Institute of Technology alumni